The Rohingya national football team represents the Rohingya people, a predominantly Muslim ethnic group in Rakhine State, Myanmar (also known as Arakan, Burma). The team is not affiliated with FIFA and therefore cannot compete for the FIFA World Cup. However, it is a member of CONIFA, a federation of football associations representing ethnic minorities and stateless nations.

The team is sponsored by Rohingya Vision TV, the Kick Project (NGO), and the Government of Australia.

Rohingya Football Club

It is composed of refugees living in Kuala Lumpur, Malaysia, who are members of the Rohingya Football Club (RFC), which was founded in 2015.

References

External links 
 
 

Rohingya people
Football associations in Malaysia
Association football clubs established in 2015
CONIFA member associations